Muel may refer to:

Muel, Zaragoza, a municipality in the province of Zaragoza, in the autonomous community of Aragon, Spain
Muel, Ille-et-Vilaine, a commune in the Ille-et-Vilaine department in Brittany in northwestern France.